The 2017 America East men's basketball tournament is the postseason men's basketball tournament for the America East Conference, which was held on March 1, 6, and 11, 2017. All games of the tournament were played on campus sites hosted by the higher-seeded school. Vermont, the No. 1 seed in the tournament defeated Albany in the championship game to win the tournament championship. As a result, they received the conference's automatic bid to the NCAA tournament.

Seeds
Only eight of the nine conference teams were eligible for the tournament (UMass Lowell was ineligible due to its transition to Division I). The teams were seeded by record in conference, with a tiebreaker system to seed teams with identical conference records.

Schedule

Bracket and results
Teams will reseed after each round with highest remaining seeds receiving home court advantage.

See also
 America East Conference
 2017 America East women's basketball tournament

References

America East Conference men's basketball tournament
2016–17 America East Conference men's basketball season
2017 in sports in Vermont
Sports competitions in Burlington, Vermont
College basketball tournaments in Vermont